A limp is a type of asymmetric abnormality of the gait. 

Limp or LIMP may also refer to:

Music
 "Limp" (song) from Fiona Apple's When the Pawn...
 Limp (band), a 1990s Californian punk group
 Limp Records, a Maryland music publisher (1978–1982)

Places
 Limp, Kentucky, U.S.
 Limp, South Carolina, U.S.
 Long Island Motor Parkway, New York, U.S.
 Parma Airport, Italy (ICAO airport code: LIMP)

Other uses
 limping, a betting pattern in the poker card game
 Liberal Imperialists, British party political faction